The Battle of Noryang, the last major battle of the Japanese invasions of Korea (1592–1598), was fought between the Japanese navy and the combined fleets of the Joseon Kingdom and the Ming dynasty. It took place in the early morning of 16 December (19 November in the Lunar calendar) 1598 and ended past dawn.

The allied force of about 150 Joseon and Ming Chinese ships, led by admirals Yi Sun-sin and Chen Lin, attacked and either destroyed or captured more than half of the 500 Japanese ships commanded by Shimazu Yoshihiro, who was attempting to link-up with Konishi Yukinaga. The battered survivors of Shimazu's fleet limped back to Pusan and a few days later, left for Japan. At the height of the battle, Yi was hit by a bullet from an arquebus and died shortly thereafter. Chen Lin reported the news back to the Wanli Emperor, and since then, Chen and Yi were celebrated as national heroes.

Name 
The battle is named after the Strait of Noryang (노량 / 露梁 Luliang), off the coast of Namhaedo of Korea.

Background
Due to setbacks in land and sea battles, the Japanese armies had been driven back to their network of fortresses, or wajō (和城), on the southeastern Korean coast. However, the wajō could not hold the entire Japanese army, so, in June 1598, Toyotomi Hideyoshi, the Taikō who instigated the Japanese invasions of Korea (1592–1598), and also the acting Japanese Lord of War, ordered 70,000 troops mostly from the Japanese Army of the Right to withdraw to the archipelago. On 18 September 1598, Hideyoshi unexpectedly died at Fushimi castle. The Japanese forces in Korea were ordered to withdraw back to Japan by the new governing Council of Five Elders. Due to the presence of Joseon and Ming ships, the Japanese garrisons in the wajō could not retreat and stayed in the relative safety of their forts.

The Sunch'on wajō was the westernmost Japanese fortress and contained 14,000 troops commanded by Konishi Yukinaga, who was the leader of Japan's vanguard contingent during the first invasion, in 1592. Yi and Chen blocked Konishi from retreat, but Konishi sent many gifts to Chen in an attempt to bribe the Ming commander into lifting the blockade. At first, Chen agreed to withdraw the allied fleet, but Yi steadfastly refused to comply. Then Chen suggested that the allied fleet attack smaller, more vulnerable wajō, such as the fort at Namhae. Yi rejected that strategy as well. Yi argued that Konishi, who commanded one of the largest wajō, would be allowed to escape if the allies were to leave and fight elsewhere.

On 15 December, about 20,000 Japanese troops from the wajō of Sach'on, Goseong, and Namhae boarded 500 ships and began to mass east of the Noryang Strait in an attempt to break the allied blockade of Sunch'on. The overall commander of this relief force was Shimazu Yoshihiro, the leader of the Sach'on wajō.

The objective of the allied fleet was to prevent the link-up of Shimazu's fleet with the fleet of Konishi, then attack and defeat Shimazu's fleet. The objective of Shimazu's fleet was to cross Noryang Strait, link up with Konishi and retreat to Pusan. Shimazu knew that Konishi was trying to cause disunity within the Joseon-Ming alliance and hoped that they would be busy elsewhere or still blockading the Sunch'on wajō and thus vulnerable to an attack from their rear.

Battle

On 15 December, a huge Japanese fleet was amassed in Sach'on Bay, on the east end of the Noryang Strait. Shimazu was not sure whether the allied fleet was continuing the blockade of Konishi's wajō, on its way to attack an abandoned wajō further east, or blocking their way on the western end of Noryang Strait. Yi, meanwhile, knew exactly where Shimazu was after receiving reports from scouts and local fishermen.

The Joseon fleet consisted of 82 panokseon multi-decked oared ships. The Ming fleet consisted of six large war junks (true battle vessels most likely used as flagships) that were driven by both oars and sails, 57 lighter war ships driven by oars alone (most likely transports converted for battle use), and two panokseon provided by Yi. In terms of manpower, the allied fleet had 8,000 sailors and marines under Yi, 5,000 Ming men of the Guangdong Squadron, and 2,600 Ming marines who fought aboard Korean ships, a total of almost 16,000 sailors and fighting men. The Ming fleet was divided into two squadrons, the larger of which was commanded by Chen and the smaller by Deng Zilong. The allied fleet was well-equipped with cannon, mortars, archers, and arquebusiers. The Japanese had 500 ships, but a significant part of their fleet consisted of light transports. The Japanese ships were well-armed with arquebuses and also had some captured Joseon cannon. The allied fleet was outnumbered, but made up for it with ships which, on average, had superior firepower and heavier, more sturdy construction.

The allied fleet waited for Shimazu on the west end of Noryang Strait. The battle began around 02:00 am on 16 December. It was, from the very beginning, a desperate affair with the Japanese determined to fight through the allied fleet and the allies equally determined to keep them from breaking through and advancing.

As in Yi's previous battles, the Japanese were unable to respond effectively as the Korean and Chinese cannon prevented them from moving. The narrowness of the Noryang Strait also prevented any maneuverability.

When the Japanese fleet was significantly damaged, Chen ordered his fleet to engage in melee combat. This, however, allowed the Japanese to use their arquebuses and fight using their traditional fighting style of boarding enemy ships. When Chen's flagship was attacked, Yi had to order his fleet to engage in hand-to-hand combat as well.

Song Hui-rip, the captain of Yi's flagship, was struck in the helmet by an arquebus ball and fell unconscious for a time. The vessels got so close that Joseon ships were able to throw burning wood onto the decks of Japanese ships.

Heavy Japanese arquebus fire forced the Chinese sailors to keep their heads low, while the Japanese closed in. Several parties boarded Chen's flagship and in the hand-to-hand fighting that ensued, Chen's son was injured parrying a sword thrust directed at his father. Seeing Chen's ship in trouble, the Ming left wing commander Deng Zilong and two hundred of his personal guard transferred to a Joseon panokseon (one of two given to the Ming fleet by Yi) and rowed to his aid. Several Ming ships, mistaking the panokseon for a Japanese ship, opened fire and disabled it. The stricken panokseon drifted towards the Japanese and they boarded and killed everyone on board, including Deng.

By the middle of the battle, as dawn was about to break, the allied fleet had the upper hand and half of Shimazu's fleet was either sunk or captured. It was said that Yoshihiro's flagship was sunk and that he was clinging to a piece of wood in the icy water. Japanese ships came to his rescue, pulling him to safety. During the course of the battle, the ships fought from the west end of the strait all the way across to the east end, almost to the open water. The Japanese sustained heavy damage and began to retreat along the south coast of Namhae Island, towards Pusan.

Yi's death

As the Japanese retreated, Yi ordered a vigorous pursuit. During this time a stray arquebus bullet from an enemy ship struck him near the armpit, on his left side. Sensing that the wound was fatal, the admiral uttered, "We are about to win the war – keep beating the war drums. Do not announce my death." and with those words he died.

Only three people witnessed Sun-sin's death including Yi Hoe, his eldest son, Song Hui-rip, and Yi Wan, his nephew. They struggled to regain their composure and carried Sun-sin's body into his cabin before others could notice. For the remainder of the battle, Wan wore his uncle's armor and continued to beat the war drum to let the rest of the fleet know that the Admiral's flagship was still in the fight.

Chen's ship was again in trouble, and Yi's flagship rowed to his rescue. Yi's flagship fought off and sank several Japanese ships, and Chen called for Yi to thank him for coming to his aid. However, Chen was met by Wan who announced that his uncle was dead. It is said that Chen himself was so shocked that he fell to the ground three times, beating his chest and crying. News of Yi's death spread quickly throughout the allied fleet.

Aftermath
Out of 500 Japanese ships under Shimazu's command, an estimated 200 were able to make it back to Pusan Harbor (other Joseon archives record that Shimazu's remnants were fiercely pursued by Yi Sun-sin's fleet: only 50 ships of Shimazu's armada ever managed to escape). Konishi Yukinaga left his fortress on 16 December and his men were able to retreat by sailing through the southern end of Namhae Island, bypassing both the Noryang Strait and the battle. Although he knew the battle was raging, he made no effort to help Shimazu. This led to the loss of crucial supply lines that caused the inevitable loss of all Japanese strongholds in Korea. Konishi, Shimazu, Katō Kiyomasa, and other Japanese generals of the Left Army congregated in Pusan and withdrew to Japan on 21 December. The last ships sailed to Japan on 24 December, bringing an end to seven years of war.

Yi Sun-sin's body was brought back to his home town in Asan to be buried next to his father, Yi Chong (in accordance with Korean tradition). The court gave him the posthumous rank of minister of the right. Shrines, both official and unofficial, were constructed in his honor. In 1643, Yi was given the title of chungmugong, "duke/lord of loyal valor".

Chen gave a eulogy while attending Yi's funeral. He then withdrew his forces to Ming China and received high military honors. Joseon officials feared another Japanese invasion and requested the Ming army to remain. The Ming agreed and left behind a force of 3–4,000, which aided Joseon efforts in rebuilding and training forces until 1601.

See also
Naval history of Korea

Citations

Bibliography

 
 
 
 
 
 
 
 
 
 
 
 桑田忠親 [Kuwata, Tadachika], ed., 舊參謀本部編纂, [Kyu Sanbo Honbu], 朝鮮の役 [Chousen no Eki]　(日本の戰史 [Nihon no Senshi] Vol. 5), 1965.
 
 
 
 
 
 
 
 
 
 
 
 
 
  
 
 
 
 
 
 

1598 in Korea
Noryang
Noryang
Noryang
Yi Sun-sin